Federal Government College, Ogbomoso is a federal government owned school located at Ogbomoso, Oyo State, Nigeria, for education of both sexes at the same institution.  The school was founded on 28 October 1977. FGCS is for boarders / day students and has a current attendance of over 1500.

The College has a diversified and operational curriculum geared towards meeting the needs and aspirations of every learner. This is driven by the various heads of department in addition to the Guidance Counseling which provides counselling support to all students.

Notable alumni
Teju Babyface, comedian and talk show host
Sound Sultan, musician
Alamu Abdulmojeed Oladapo, Educator, Mpumalanga Department of Education, South Africa
Lekan Adeleye, Also known as Lekan kingkong Agba inaki

References

Secondary schools in Oyo State
Ogbomosho
Educational institutions established in 1977
1977 establishments in Nigeria
Government schools in Nigeria